Betty Folliard (born August 31, 1951) is an American politician in the state of Minnesota. She served in the Minnesota House of Representatives.

References

Women state legislators in Minnesota
Democratic Party members of the Minnesota House of Representatives
1951 births
Living people
Politicians from Madison, Wisconsin
Wayne State University
21st-century American women